In isotropic turbulence the Kármán–Howarth equation (after Theodore von Kármán and Leslie Howarth 1938), which is derived from the Navier–Stokes equations, is used to describe the evolution of non-dimensional longitudinal autocorrelation.

Mathematical description
Consider a two-point velocity correlation tensor for homogeneous turbulence

 

For isotropic turbulence, this correlation tensor can be expressed in terms of two scalar functions, using the invariant theory of full rotation group, first derived by Howard P. Robertson in 1940,

From continuity equation, we have

Thus  uniquely determines the two-point correlation function.

where  uniquely determines the triple correlation tensor

Loitsianskii's invariant

L.G. Loitsianskii derived an integral invariant for the decay of the turbulence by taking the fourth moment of the Kármán–Howarth equation in 1939, i.e.,

which is invariant. Lev Landau and Evgeny Lifshitz showed that this invariant is equivalent to conservation of angular momentum. However, Ian Proudman and W.H. Reid showed that this invariant does not hold always since  is not in general zero, at least, in the initial period of the decay. In 1967, Philip Saffman showed that this integral depends on the initial conditions and the integral can diverge under certain conditions.

Decay of turbulence
For the viscosity dominated flows, during the decay of turbulence, the Kármán–Howarth equation reduces to a heat equation once the triple correlation tensor is neglected, i.e.,

With suitable boundary conditions, the solution to above equation is given by

so that,

See also
 Kármán–Howarth–Monin equation (Andrei Monin's anisotropic generalization of the Kármán–Howarth relation)
 Batchelor–Chandrasekhar equation (homogeneous axisymmetric turbulence)
 Corrsin equation (Kármán–Howarth relation for scalar transport equation)
 Chandrasekhar invariant (density fluctuation invariant in isotropic homogeneous turbulence)

References

Equations of fluid dynamics
Fluid dynamics
Turbulence